Mohammad Ahmed Al-Maharmeh is a retired Jordanian football player who played as a right back.

References
 Al-Maharmeh: "Al-Faisaly (Amman) is the Leader and the Greatest"
 Mohammad Al-Maharmeh Returns to Al-Wahdat SC After the End of His Loan With Shabab Al-Ordon

External links
 

1984 births
Living people
Association football midfielders
Jordanian footballers
Jordan international footballers
Jordan youth international footballers
Footballers at the 2006 Asian Games
Sahab SC players
Al-Wehdat SC players
Shabab Al-Ordon Club players
That Ras Club players
Al-Ramtha SC players
Jordanian Pro League players
Asian Games competitors for Jordan